Salzwedel station is the station of the district town of Salzwedel in Altmark in the German state of Saxony-Anhalt. Until 2004, it was a railway junction, but as a result of the closure of nearly all branch lines it has lost most of its importance. Only one railway line still runs through Salzwedel.

History

Salzwedel station was built in 1870 during the construction of the Stendal–Uelzen railway (part of the America Line from Berlin to Bremen and Bremerhaven) by the Magdeburg-Halberstadt Railway Company. Railways  formerly ran in seven directions from Salzwedel station or Salzwedel Neustadt station (which lay to the immediate east), as the table below shows.  A locomotive depot (Bahnbetriebswerk) was built directly next to it in order to service these routes. During the Second World War, the station area was destroyed in an air raid on 22 February 1945, which caused about 300 deaths. Of the seven lines, only the Stendal–Uelzen railway remain. During the division of Germany the line was cut at the border, but continuous operations were restored on 19 December 1999. It has been extensively modernised since reunification and electrified so that it can be used an alternative route for Intercity-Express train from Berlin to Hamburg.

Passenger services on the last additional line connecting to the station, the Salzwedel–Wittenberg railway, were closed at the timetable change in December 2004. It had recently been upgraded. The decades-old Ferkeltaxe (“piglet taxis”) class VT2.09 railbuses were replaced by modern Desiro low-floor railcars built by Siemens from 2003. But neither they nor a specially formed citizens' initiative could save the route.

The station
The area around the station was reconstructed from scratch in the late 1990s. Deutsche Bahn renovated the entrance building and built two new island platforms, which can be reached by a new underpass with its entrance in an extension of the station building. The town of Salzwedel built a new bus station on the station forecourt and a large station parking area.

Rail services 
Operations of regional train services were converted a few years ago to modern class 425 electric railcars. Since the timetable change in December 2006, the RE 20 service has been operated with double-deck trains.

In the 2016 timetable the following services serve Salzwedel station:

Until mid-December 2014 the station was also served by EuroCity "Wawel", which used to run once daily between Hamburg Altona and Wrocław Główny six days a week.

Every two-hour buses run from the bus station as the Arendsee Express to Wittenberg and as "Drömling-Express" to Oebisfelde. These services were established after the cancellation of passenger services on the Salzwedel–Wittenberg railway and the Oebisfelde–Salzwedel railway.

Notes

External links

 

Railway stations in Saxony-Anhalt
Railway stations in Germany opened in 1870
Altmarkkreis Salzwedel